Soul of a Songwriter is the debut album by Ryan Toby released on 2006 by Overflow Entertainment.

Track listing
"Soul Of A Songwriter (Intro)"
"I'm In Love"
"Just My Thang"
"All I Do"
"Change Goin Come"
"Ride Out (Interlude)"
"Come Back"
"So Good"
"Don't Worry"
"Miss America"
"Soul Of A Songwriter (Outro)"

Sources

2006 albums